Cunningham is an unincorporated community in Hardy County, West Virginia, United States. It lies north of Moorefield along the South Branch Valley Railroad and Trough Road (County Route 6) on the eastern side of the South Branch Potomac River.

References

Unincorporated communities in Hardy County, West Virginia
Populated places on the South Branch Potomac River
Unincorporated communities in West Virginia